Jamie Marcellus Nails (born June 3, 1977 in Baxley, Georgia) is a former American football guard of the National Football League. He was drafted by the Buffalo Bills in the fourth round of the 1997 NFL Draft. He played college football at Florida A&M. Jamie is now an athletic coach for youth athletes in Georgia. He has two daughters by the name of Joy and Jacy Nails.

Nails also played for the Miami Dolphins.

1977 births
Living people
American football offensive guards
Florida A&M Rattlers football players
Buffalo Bills players
Miami Dolphins players
Players of American football from Georgia (U.S. state)
People from Baxley, Georgia
Ed Block Courage Award recipients